The Whitehead product is a mathematical construction introduced in . It has been a useful tool in determining the properties of spaces. The mathematical notion of space includes every shape that exists in our 3-dimensional world such as curves, surfaces, and solid figures. Since spaces are often presented by formulas, it is usually not possible to visually determine their geometric properties. Some of these properties are connectedness (is the space in one or several pieces), the number of holes the space has, the knottedness of the space, and so on.  Spaces are then studied by assigning algebraic constructions to them. This is similar to what is done in high school analytic geometry whereby to certain curves in the plane (geometric objects) are assigned equations (algebraic constructions). The most common algebraic constructions are groups. These are sets such that any two members of the set can be combined to yield a third member of the set (subject to certain restrictions). In homotopy theory, one assigns a group to each space X and positive integer p called the pth homotopy group of X. These groups have been studied extensively and give information about the properties of the space X. There are then operations among these groups (the Whitehead product) which provide additional information about the spaces. This has been very important in the study of homotopy groups.

The generalised Whitehead product assigns to an element α in the homotopy set [ΣA, X] and an element β in the homotopy set [ΣB, X], an element [α, β] in the homotopy set [Σ(A ∧ B), X], where A, B, and X are spaces, Σ is the suspension (topology), and ∧ is the smash product. It is a generalization of the Whitehead product and 
provides a useful technique in the investigation of homotopy sets.

The relevant MSC code is: 55Q15, Whitehead products and generalizations.

Definition
The commutator 

The generalised Whitehead product is then defined as the unique element 

such that , where  is the quotient map.

Properties
Naturality: f∗[α, β] = [f∗(α), f∗(β)], if f : X → Y is a map.

All [α, β] = 0, if X is an H-space.

E[α, β] = 0, where E : [Σ(A ∧ B), X] → [Σ2 (A ∧ B), ΣX] is the suspension homomorphism.

Bi-additivity, if A and B are suspensions.

A form of anti-commutativity.

An appropriate Jacobi identity for α and β as above and γ ∈ [ΣC, X], if A,
B, and C are suspensions.

See  for full statements of these results and proofs.

Applications
The product ΣA × ΣB has the homotopy type of the mapping cone of [ιΣA, ιΣB] ∈ [Σ(A ∧ B), ΣA ∨ ΣB].

Whitehead products for homotopy groups with coefficients are obtained by
taking A and B to be Moore spaces (pp. 110–114)

There is a weak homotopy equivalence between a wedge of suspensions of
finitely many spaces and an infinite product of suspensions of various smash products of the spaces according to the Milnor-Hilton theorem. The map is defined by generalised Whitehead products .

Related results
If Y is a group-like H-space, then a product [A, Y] × [B, Y] → [A ∧ B, Y]
is defined in analogy with the generalised Whitehead product. This is the generalised Samelson product denoted <σ, τ> for σ ∈ [A, Y] and τ ∈ [B, Y] . If λU,V : [U, ΩV] → [ΣU, V] is the adjoint isomorphism, where Ω is the loop space functor, then λA∧B,X<σ, τ>= [λA,X (σ), λB,X (τ)] for Y = ΩX.

An Eckmann–Hilton dual of the generalised Whitehead product can be defined as follows. Let A♭B be the homotopy fiber of the inclusion j : A ∨ B → A × B, that is, the space of paths in A × B which begin in A ∨ B and end at the base point and let γ ∈ [X, ΩA] and δ ∈ [X, ΩB]. For (ΩιA)γ and (ΩιB)δ in [X, Ω(A ∨ B)], let d(γ, δ) ∈ [X, Ω(A ∨ B)] be their commutator. Since (Ωj) d(γ, δ) is trivial, there is a unique element {γ, δ} ∈ [X, Ω(A♭B)] such that (Ωp){γ, δ} = d(γ, δ), where p : A♭B → A ∨ B projects a path onto its initial point. For an application of this, let K(π, n) denote an Eilenberg–MacLane space and identify [X, K(π, n)] with the cohomology group Hn(X; π). If A = K(G, p) and B = K(G′, q), then there is a map θ : A♭B → K(G ⊗ G', p+q+1) such that (Ωθ){γ, δ} = γ ∪ δ, the cup product in Hp+q(X; G ⊗ G′).

References

 .

 .

 .

.
.
.

 .

.
 .

Homotopy theory
Lie algebras